F3: Fun and Frustration is a 2022 Indian Telugu-language comedy film written and directed by Anil Ravipudi and produced by Dil Raju and Sirish under the banner Sri Venkateswara Creations. It is a standalone sequel to F2: Fun and Frustration (2019) and the second installment of Fun and Frustration series. The film stars Venkatesh, Varun Tej, Tamannaah and Mehreen Pirzada reprising their roles from the prequel. Devi Sri Prasad composed the music.

Principal photography commenced in December 2020 and ended in January 2022; filming took place in Hyderabad. The film was released on 27 May 2022.

Plot
Venky, who works as an agent at a RTO in Hyderabad, struggles to meet his ends and suffers from night blindness, but hides his disability from everyone. His friend Varun Yadav, an orphan, stutter plans various schemes to make money, but to no avail. Venky, along with his friend, loses a lot of their money after investing in Harika's family restaurant. In a search for money, Varun mistakes Honey (Harika's sister) for a rich woman and plans to marry her. Venky agrees to fund Varun's plan, failing to recognize Honey due to his disability. Venky and Varun take a huge amount of loan from Pala Baby, a local landlord by pledging their property. After spending lakhs of rupees by giving expensive gifts and cash to Honey, they realize their mistake while Harika's family loses all their money in shares.

Pala Baby, who worships women, drops his plans to waive off the loan after realizing the guile methods of Harika's family. They all reach the police station to settle their issue, where CI Nagaraju, an honest policeman who is on the brink of losing his job, hatches a plan to raid commissioner Dileep Chandra's house with them to steal the illegally acquired cash and diamonds. They successfully execute their plan and hide the valuables in the boot of a scrap car. While doing so, they also rescue a kidnapped girl. The following morning, they confess their robbery to  Dileep out of fear. However, the car goes missing and Dileep threatens their life if they fail to return the stolen amount. When Venky, Varun, Harika, and Nagaraju are about to commit suicide, they receive news that billionaire Anand Sharma was looking for his prodigal son. 

They decide to go to his place and claim themselves as his son to steal his wealth. However, they almost die because of their plans of committing suicide. Thankfully, they get saved by rare occasions. They all reach his place in Vizianagaram. Venky, Varun, Harika (in a male disguise), and a junior artist hired by Nagaraju present themselves as Anand's son. Unsure of who the right person is, Anand lets everyone stay in his palace. They scheme against each other and utterly fail to impress Anand. All the contenders endure the toughest of the tests given by Anand. As a final effort, Anand announces that whoever brings his F3 toy factory to profits shall be declared as his heir. Putting their differences aside, all the contenders team up together to create a new kind of toy to achieve profit. They develop a set of interactive toys by merchandising Telugu film characters, namely, Amarendra Baahubali, Gabbar Singh, Ajay Krishna, Veera Raghava, Chitti Babu and Bantu. 

The sales skyrocket and the factory earns a bumper profit. They together elect Varun and present him to Anand as his rightful heir. However, Anand reveals that his son died by suicide several years ago after earning money by fraudulent means. Since they have rescued his granddaughter, Anand allowed them to prove themselves and offers them the profit that they earned. Venky and Varun realize their mistakes and give up the money. Venky, Varun, and others arrive at the place but they are attacked by the goons. Initially, they try to confuse them but when the plan fails, Venky dresses up as Narappa and Varun as Vakeel Saab, and thrash the goons together. When they are trying to leave, the police arrive and arrest everyone.

Meanwhile, the thief who stole the car reveals to Dileep that he sold all the diamonds at a cheap rate mistaking them for regular gemstones, and later gets elected as an MLA with the support of his buyers, and Dileep, who is ousted out of his job joins him as an assistant.

Cast 

 Venkatesh as Venky
 Varun Tej as Varun Yadav
 Tamannaah as Harika
 Mehreen Pirzada as Honey
 Rajendra Prasad as Nagaraju
 Murali Sharma as Anand Prasad
 Sunil as Katthi Seenu
 Sonal Chauhan as American girl
 Vennela Kishore as Junior Artist, Gudivada Gurunatham's son
 Ali as Pala Baby
 Sampath Raj as Commissioner Dileep Chandra
 Raghu Babu as Venky's companion
 Tulasi as Venky's step mother
 Goparaju Ramana as Venky's father
 Sathvik Varma as Venky's step brother
 Satya as the thief
 Pragathi as Padma, Harika's and Honey's mother
 Pradeep Kondiparthi as Harika's and Honey's father
 Y. Vijaya as Harika's and Honey's maternal grandmother
 Annapoorna as Harika's and Honey's paternal grandmothe
 Srikanth Iyengar as Sharma, Anand Prasad's assistant 
 Prudhvi Raj as Palace Incharge
 Tanikella Bharani as Police officer
 Gundu Sudarshan as Land owner
 Rajitha as Land Owner's wife
 Vasu Inturi as Honey's driver
 Rajendran as Gudivada Gurunatham
 Srinivasa Reddy as goon's henchmen
 Divya Sripada as Vishal Mitthal's daughter
 Getup Srinu as Bull Chittibabu's breeder
 Duvvasi Mohan as Bull Chittibabu's breeder
 Pooja Hegde as herself (cameo appearance in the song "Life Ante Itta Vundaala")
 Anil Ravipudi as himself (cameo appearance)

Production

Development 
Following the success of F2: Fun and Frustration (2019), studio owner Dil Raju announced its sequel in February 2019. He added that a third lead actor will be cast for the sequel. However, in April 2020, director Ravipudi clarified that there was little space for a third protagonist. In an interview in March 2021, Ravipudi said: "F3 is not a [direct] sequel to F2. It is completely a new story where the leads are seen getting frustrated caused by money."

Cast and crew 
Venkatesh, Tej, Prasad, Tamannaah and Pirzada are reprising their roles in the sequel. Devi Sri Prasad, who scored the music for F2, is retained as the music composer. Sunil and Murali Sharma signed to play a key roles in the film. In April 2021, it was reported that Anjali was cast in the film, though there is no official communication yet. Rajendra Prasad was also set to return with a different role. Venkatesh plays a night blind while Tej's character would be suffering from stuttering. Sonal Chauhan confirmed that her appearance in the film in October 2021, describing her role as a "surprise". In April 2022, Pooja Hegde was signed on for a special song.

Filming 
F3  was formally launched on 6 December 2020. Principal photography of the film began on 26 December 2020 in Hyderabad. Varun Tej has joined the production in January 2021. Due to COVID-19 pandemic in India, filming was paused from April to June. Filming was planned to be resumed in July 2021 with 10-day long schedule. However, the filming resumed in September 2021. In December 2021, filming took place at Charminar and nearly 85% of the shoot is completed. The talkie portions were wrapped in January 2022 with only a song left to shoot. A special song featuring Hegde was filmed in April 2022 at a specially constructed set at the Annapurna Studios.

Music 

The soundtrack and score of the film is composed by Devi Sri Prasad. The audio rights were acquired by Aditya Music. First single "Lab Dab Dabboo" was released in February 2021. The second single "Woo Aaa Aha Aha" was released on 22 April 2022.

On 17 May 2022, the third single track "Life Ante Itta Vundaala" was launched, which had vocals by Geetha Madhuri and Rahul Sipligunj. The song featuring Pooja Hegde received positive response.

Release

Theatrical 
F3 was released on 27 May 2022. Earlier, it was scheduled to be released on 27 August 2021, but was deferred due to the COVID-19 pandemic. It was later scheduled to release theatrically on 25 February 2022, but was postponed to avoid clash with Bheemla Nayak which released on that date. Its release date was scheduled as 28 April 2022 but it was again delayed and moved to the current date to avoid clash with Acharya.

The film's pre-release theatrical business stood at  crore, and needs a worldwide gross over  crore in order to be a profitable venture.

Home media 
The satellite rights of the film were sold to Zee Telugu while the digital distribution rights were acquired by Sony LIV and Netflix. F3 was made available for streaming from 22 July 2022 on Sony LIV and on Netflix.

Reception

Critical response
F3 received generally favourable reviews from the critics with praise for the cast and direction. 

Writing for Cinema Express, Murali Krishna Ch called F3 a "laugh-riot." Considering it an improvement over its predecessor, Krishna praised Anil Ravipudi's direction and performances, particularly Venkatesh and Tej. Echoing the same, Sangeetha Devi Dundoo of The Hindu stated: "the comedy franchise, though uneven, elicits ample laughter, and Venkatesh shines." Balakrishna Ganeshan of The News Minute gave the film a rating of 5/5 and wrote "'F3' does not have much of a plot but a series of comedy events keeps the audience engaged".

Neeshitha Nyayapati of The Times of India gave the film a rating of 2.5/5 and compared F3 with the Golmaal franchise, terming it: "loud, messy, sometimes funny". Arvind V of Pinkvilla gave the film a rating of 2.5/5 and wrote "Venkatesh's performance is of quality. Quite a few others show conviction, but somehow, most of them don't get to make a stellar presence". In his review for Deccan Herald, Karthik Keramalu,opined it's a "half-hearted comedy" which Ravipudi got partly correct while praising the comic timing of the lead actors.

Firstpost reviewer Sankeertana Varma criticized the film's logic and story, calling it a "laughable attempt at comedy and entertainment." Manoj Kumar R of The Indian Express gave the film a rating of 1/5 and wrote "Anil is really scraping the bottom of the barrel with the Venkatesh, Varun Tej starrer. His attempts at comedy lack both sincerity and originality".

Box office
F3 grossed  worldwide on its opening day, including  from the states of Andhra Pradesh and Telangana. The film grossed  in its opening weekend. After theatrical run ends, the film's total gross collection stood at  worldwide.

References

External links 

Indian comedy films
Indian sequel films
Films scored by Devi Sri Prasad
Films shot in Hyderabad, India
Sri Venkateswara Creations films
Film productions suspended due to the COVID-19 pandemic
2020s Telugu-language films
Films directed by Anil Ravipudi
2022 comedy films
Films set in Hyderabad, India
Films set in Andhra Pradesh
Fictional portrayals of the Telangana Police
Fictional portrayals of the Andhra Pradesh Police
Cross-dressing in Indian films